Francois Cousin House may refer to:

Francois Cousin House (Lacombe, Louisiana), on Main Street, listed on the NRHP in St. Tammany Parish, Louisiana
Francois Cousin House (Slidell, Louisiana), on Gwin Road, listed on the NRHP in St. Tammany Parish, Louisiana